Directed individual study (DIS) is a college, university or  college preparatory school level class providing a more in-depth and comprehensive study of a specific topic than is available in the classroom.

Courses may be taken as electives. In some cases, a directed individual study may be: 
 a professor-student rendition of a course that will not be offered again before a student graduates
 the college or university department does not have an established course on the subject area
 the student wishes to research an available course in more depth
 a course offered at another college or university that is not a part of the general curriculum.
 courses that may be applied to satisfy the requirements for a Master's degree.

Requirements

In general, a student should have or may have to acquire: 
 an earned overall GPA of 3.0 (B) or better
 an earned 90 hours toward graduation 
 have registered for a course load of no more than 15 semester hours
 the advance approval of the department head of the department offering the course, and the instructor
 follow an approved course of study of prerequisite or courses.

Process
A student identifies an area in which he or she wishes to undertake research and approaches a faculty member with expertise in that field to request a directed individual study.

The student and instructor complete a DIS form and submit it to the academic coordinator who establishes the course in the registration system. The student often titles his/her own subject area.

The content and requirements of the course are worked out between each instructor and student. Generally, students should not expect a faculty member to agree to a directed individual study unless they have had the student in a regular class and are familiar with that student. The faculty member develops a related syllabus, for review and approval by the department chair and in some cases the dean of the college.

References

Sources 
University of Missouri-Kansas City, Doctor of Pharmacy
Washington and Lee University, Department of Accounting
University of Alabama, Department of Consumer Sciences
Florida State University, Department of Political Science
Denison University Registrar's Office. Requirements for Directed/Independent Study  
University of North Carolina-Wilmington, Communications
Cranbrook Kingswood Upper School Curriculum Guide. (See page 4 for directed study information.)


Curricula
Higher education
Education in the United States